Spokane Veterans Memorial Arena (Spokane Arena) is a multi-purpose arena in the northwestern United States, located in Spokane, Washington. Opened  in 1995, it is home to the Spokane Chiefs of the Western Hockey League.

Facility

Construction
With an aging Spokane Coliseum, along with a need for a larger facility more than twice the coliseum's capacity, the Spokane City Council and Board of Spokane County Commissioners formed the Spokane Public Facilities District  (SPFD) to acquire, construct, own and operate sports and entertainment facilities with contiguous parking facilities. In 1990, the SPFD board members unanimously agreed on the following recommendations made by an economic feasibility/market study. The recommendations were:
To build an arena opposed to a domed stadium
An arena that could seat 12,000 to 14,000 with expansion capabilities
To build the new arena on city-owned land located adjacent to the old coliseum with on-site parking for 2,000 automobiles

Voters rejected the Spokane Arena four times in six years before agreeing to build it in 1991.

In the fall of that year, two ballot measures were put out to voters, and passed:
One, to publicly finance the construction of the arena through a property tax bond issue worth US$38 million
Two, a measure to validate the SPFD. Validation was important, because it would allow the district to implement a 2% hotel tax to further fund construction.
 
In the fall of 1991, another funding measure was put out to voters and was passed. It involved a 0.1% raise in the sales tax. The passage of all three measures completed the $44.8 million financining needed to build the arena.

Ground was broken on March 5, 1993, and it opened 2½ years later, in September 1995.

Building facts

The Spokane Arena has a capacity for:
12,638 for end-stage concerts
12,494 for center-stage shows
12,210 for basketball
10,771 for arena football
10,366 for ice hockey
6,951 for half-house shows

The arena has a state-of-the-art audio and video system. It consists of a  Viacom Sports 12 mm LED display, which is capable of being used as two separate units. The video board has exceptional color reproduction and the best off-angle viewing available for any LED format. The arena also features a 350° color LED ribbon board, which is mounted on the fascia of the Spokane Arena bowl. It is capable of displaying text messages, animations, logos, scores and statistics.

Powered by Crown Amplifiers, the audio system is driven by Community RS880 speakers in the arena bowl, Altec Lansing satellite speakers for the upper seating areas, and Bose speakers serve the concourse, dressing rooms, and backstage hallways.

Large public areas are one of the greater features of the Spokane Arena. Sixteen luxury suites contain a total of 146 seats. In addition, there are six meeting rooms, totaling  of meeting space.

On the Events Level, there are five truck docks with  loading doors, one  drive-in door, and one  drive-in loading door, allowing large shows to load and unload eight trucks simultaneously. Trucks can load and unload unobstructed, directly into the marshalling area at the arena floor's west end. Backstage are three star dressing rooms, two promoter offices (located in the marshalling area), and seven team dressing rooms, as well as a dressing room for officials.

2012 expansion/future
Incorporated into its original design was an area designated for future expansion of the arena. Expansion of the upper bowl would raise the seating capacity of the arena to over 15,000. In 2011, the Spokane Public Facilities District became concerned the NCAA may tighten its criteria and require a true minimum of 12,000, with no allowance for seats lost due to tournament infrastructure. In early 2012, the Spokane Public Facilities District had "Measure 1" put on the April ballot, which was proposing to extend 0.1% sales tax and a 2% room tax to pay for a 91,000-square-foot addition to the Convention Center and other projects, including adding 750 seats to the Arena.

Measure 1 was voted yes, and the 750 seats will eventually be added to the arena. However, the seats that are to be added may have sight obstruction to the video wall, as it would be on the same side facing away. After this phase of new seating, full expansion of the arena including a center hung scoreboard and full seating expansion will cost roughly $3.547 million.

It is unknown as to whether the PFD will max out the arena's capacity.

Events

Sports

Basketball
Spokane Arena, in addition to its duties as being the host of Chiefs and Shock games, also has served as a secondary home for the men's basketball programs of Gonzaga University and Washington State University for nearly every year since opened. Washington State has played 33 matchups in the Spokane Arena in 19 of the 22 years with a record of 18–15 (1–7 vs. ranked opponents), while Gonzaga has hosted 18 games in 15 of the 22 years with a record of 12–6 (1–2 vs. ranked opposition). In-state rivals Washington State and Gonzaga have faced off against each other in the arena on five occasions (1995, 1996, 1998, 1999, and 2014) with the Zags owning a 3–2 record against the Cougars in those games. The Bulldogs' faced off against local rival Eastern Washington University at the arena in four consecutive years (2002, 2003, 2004, and 2005), each won by the Zags, but just like with the Cougars, the rivalry has gone dormant due to the rise of the Zags' program to major status since the late 1990s, while the Cougars and Eagles have not seen much national spotlight. Washington State has often hosted home games at the Spokane Arena as a part of its Pac-12 Conference men's basketball schedule, holding a 7–9 against conference foes in the arena, facing UCLA (1996 and 2004), Oregon (1997 and 2011), Oregon State (1997, 2011, and 2017), Arizona (1998, 2001, and 2006), Washington (1999), USC (2000 and 2004), Stanford (2004), California (2005), and Colorado (2014). With Gonzaga's rise to prominence, the Zags were able to bring high major schools like Washington (1998), Georgia (2003), Memphis (2007, 2009, and 2011) and Oklahoma (2009) to the Spokane Arena, with the Gonzaga holding a 2–3 record in those matchups, but with conference realignment and the West Coast Conference's additions of BYU (2011) and Pacific (2013), the Zags have been more selective and limited in their scheduling with four less matchups in their non-conference schedule, so they have only played in the Spokane Arena once since 2012.

It also hosted the WIAA Class B state high school basketball tournament annually until 2006. The tournament came back to the arena in 2007, but as the Class 2B tournament. The WIAA had split the B classification into 1B and 2B. The Yakima SunDome in Yakima hosts the 1B tournament. The Class 1B tournament returned in 2011 when the WIAA changed the state tournament format.

Notably, this was the reason why the West Coast Conference men's basketball tournament had never been in Spokane before 2006; the Class B and WCC tournaments clash every year, and Gonzaga's on-campus arena at that time, the Charlotte Y. Martin Centre, was too small to host the WCC tournament (it seated only 4,000 people). In 2004, Gonzaga opened a new on-campus arena, the McCarthey Athletic Center, which enabled it to enter the WCC tournament rotation. The conference has since moved its tournament to the neutral Orleans Arena in Las Vegas.

NCAA Division I tournaments 
Spokane Arena has been the site of several NCAA Division I basketball tournament games (men and women), with Washington State University as the designated host school. For the men, the arena hosted in the opening rounds in 2003, 2007, 2010, 2014, and 2016, the latter of which hosted by the University of Idaho for the first time.  Prior to the arena's opening, the NCAA tournament was held in the region on the WSU campus in Pullman at Beasley Coliseum (1975, 1982, 1984).

The arena was a women's regional site in 2008, 2011, and 2015. The 2011 regional was notable as Gonzaga became the lowest-seeded team ever to make a regional final in the women's tournament.

Bull riding
In 1999, the PBR made a stop in Spokane Arena for a Bud Light Cup Series event; it was one of six wins for Cody Hart in 1999, the same year he became a PBR World Champion.

Figure skating
In January 2007, the Spokane Arena was put in the national spotlight once again. It was one of two facilities to host the 2007 U.S. Figure Skating Championships, the other being the Group Health Exhibit Hall at the Spokane Center several blocks away. The arena, as well as the city received many rave reviews and also shattered the previous attendance record for the event, previously held by Los Angeles, California, by over 30,000 attendees.

On May 5, 2008, it was announced that Spokane would once again host the U.S. Figure Skating Championships leading up to the 2010 Winter Olympics. Spokane Arena was the sole venue for the 2010 U.S. Figure Skating Championships. Held January 15–24, it broke its own attendance record with 158,170 tickets sold during the ten-day event.

Also, the Spokane Arena hosted the very first 2016 Team Challenge Cup, where athletes from North America, Europe, and Asia, competed against each other in teams. Team North America won the event.

Football
The Spokane Shock of the af2 and the Arena Football League played at the arena from 2006 until 2015. The Shock hosted ArenaBowl XXIII in 2010. The Shock then attempted to join the Indoor Football League in 2015 but the AFL withheld the franchise rights from the ownership. The owners then created the Spokane Empire and played in the IFL in 2016 and 2017 before ceasing operations. New ownership relaunched the Shock in 2020, but had its lease terminated by the city in February 2022.

Ice hockey
The Spokane Chiefs of the WHL play their home games at the arena. 

The arena hosted a National Hockey League preseason game between the Seattle Kraken and Vancouver Canucks on September 26, 2021. This is not the first time an NHL game has been played at the arena. In fact, the first event in the arena's history was a preseason game between the San Jose Sharks and Vancouver in 1995.

Concerts at Star Theatre
The Star Theatre is a 5,900-seat theater configuration used for theater concerts, Broadway, family shows and other events.  The seating capacity of the configuration positions the "venue" between the seating capacities of the nearby First Interstate Center for the Arts and the full-theater seating configuration of the Spokane Arena.

Other events
Numerous other activities have taken place at the Spokane Arena including circuses, large conferences, monster truck shows, concerts and much more. And every year the arena is home to Spokane's band and strings spectacular featuring the areas band and strings groups grades 5-6 from all schools.

Over the years the venue has hosted a variety of professional wrestling shows.

Notable events hosted
1995 – San Jose Sharks vs. Vancouver Canucks (National Hockey League exhibition game – September 17)
Gonzaga and Washington State played the Arena's first collegiate basketball game; WSU won 72–67 in overtime – November 24.
1996 – Wrangler Pro Rodeo Classic
United States Olympic Wrestling Trials.
U.S.A. Motorsports Spectacular
Stars on Ice
Phish – November 22
1997 – The Harlem Globetrotters
Western Hockey League All-Star Game
NCAA Volleyball Final Four
1998 – Stars on Ice
Memorial Cup
WWF Raw is War
2002 – Skate America figure skating competition
2003 – NCAA  Basketball Tournament
WWE SmackDown!
2004 – Kid Rock Rock N' Roll Pain Train Tour
2007 – NCAA  Basketball Tournament
2009 – Taylor Swift Fearless Tour
2010 – U.S. Figure Skating Championships
NCAA Basketball
Tournament
Brad Paisley concert
ArenaBowl XXIII
Disney on Ice
2011 – Elton John
PBR Classic
NCAA Women's Basketball Regionals
Kiss concert – June
2013 – NCAA Women's Basketball Regionals
Pearl Jam concert – November 30
2014 – NCAA basketball tournament
Fleetwood Mac concert
Mötley Crüe concert, part of their Farewell Tour
2015 – NCAA Women's Basketball Regionals
2016 – NCAA basketball tournament
Kellogg's Tour of Gymnastics Champions
2018 – Godsmack and Shinedown concert
Metallica concert
2021 – Seattle Kraken vs. Vancouver Canucks (National Hockey League exhibition game – September 26)
2022 – Paul McCartney Got Back Tour concert – April 28
Backstreet Boys DNA World Tour – August 21
2023 – Shania Twain Queen of Me Tour – April 28

References

External links

Spokane Arena website

College basketball venues in the United States
Gonzaga Bulldogs basketball venues
Gymnastics venues in the United States
Indoor ice hockey venues in the United States
Spokane Chiefs
Spokane Public Facilities District
Sports venues in Spokane, Washington
Western Hockey League arenas
Tourist attractions in Spokane, Washington
Sports venues completed in 1995
1995 establishments in Washington (state)
Indoor arenas in Washington (state)
Music venues in Washington (state)